Frank Schätzing (born 28 May 1957) is a German writer, mostly known for his best-selling science fiction novel The Swarm (2004).

Life 
Schätzing was born in Cologne and studied communication studies; he later ran his own company, an advertising agency named INTEVI, in Cologne. Schätzing became a writer in 1990, and penned several novellas and satires. His first published novel was the historical Tod und Teufel (Death and Devil) in 1995, and in 2000 his thriller Lautlos.

Schätzing achieved his greatest success in 2004 with the science fiction thriller The Swarm.

Works

Books 
 Death and Devil (original title: Tod und Teufel, 1995)
 Mordshunger, 1996, (German screen adaptation: Mordshunger) 
 Die dunkle Seite (1997), 
 Keine Angst (1999), 
 Lautlos (2000), 
 The Swarm (original title: Der Schwarm, 2004)
 Nachrichten aus einem unbekannten Universum (2006), 
 Die tollkühnen Abenteuer der Ducks auf hoher See (ed.) (2006), 
 [Limit] (2009), 
 Breaking News (2014) 
 Die Tyrannei des Schmetterlings (2018)

Audiobooks 
 Tod und Teufel (1999/2003)
 Keine Angst (2001)
 Der Schwarm (2004)
 Nachrichten aus einem unbekannten Universum (2006)

Prizes 
 2005 Goldene Feder (Der Schwarm)
 2005 Deutscher Science Fiction Preis (Der Schwarm)
 2005 Kurd-Laßwitz-Preis (Der Schwarm)
 2004 "Corine" (in the category belletristic literature)

External links 
 
 Biography 
 
 
 Reviews of Nachrichten aus einem unbekannten Universum, Der Schwarm, Lautlos, Die dunkle Seite, Tod und Teufel 
 Review of Der Schwarm audiobook 
 Biography at Buchtips.net 
 Uma Thurman buys rights to 'The Swarm'
 
 Frank Schätzing in NRW Literatur im Netz 

1957 births
Living people
Writers from Cologne
German crime fiction writers
German science fiction writers
Bancarella Prize winners
German male novelists